Lyudmila Borisovna Yegorova (24 February 1931 – 21 May 2009)  was a Russian artistic gymnast. She competed at the 1956 Summer Olympics, finishing within top 10 in all artistic gymnastics events, except for uneven bars. She won a team all-around gold medal and a bronze medal in the now-defunct team portable apparatus exercise. 

She won four national titles in acrobatics in 1950–1953, and was a runner up in the vault and all-around in 1955 and 1956. She later graduated from the Institute of Physical Education in Saint Petersburg and worked as a gymnastics coach. At the time of her death she headed the Kaliningrad branch of Russian Athletes' Union.

References

1931 births
2009 deaths
Gymnasts at the 1956 Summer Olympics
Olympic gymnasts of the Soviet Union
Olympic gold medalists for the Soviet Union
Olympic bronze medalists for the Soviet Union
Olympic medalists in gymnastics
Soviet female artistic gymnasts
Medalists at the 1956 Summer Olympics